Əlvənd (also, Al’vend) is a village and municipality in the Zardab Rayon of Azerbaijan.  It has a population of 1012.

References 

Populated places in Zardab District